North American League may refer to:

 North American League (baseball), an independent professional baseball league based in San Ramon, California
 North American Soccer League (2011–2017), a D2 professional soccer league from 2011 to 2017
 North American Soccer League (1968–1984), a D1 professional soccer league from 1968 to 1984

See also
 North American League of Legends Challenger Series
 North American League of Legends Championship Series